Lagimodière is a provincial electoral district (riding) in the Canadian province of Manitoba that came into effect at the 2019 Manitoba general election. It elects one member to the Legislative Assembly of Manitoba.

The riding was created by the 2018 provincial redistribution out of part of Southdale and small parts of Radisson, St. Vital, and Seine River.

The riding contains the Winnipeg neighbourhoods of Royalwood, Island Lakes, and Sage Creek.

The riding is apparently named for Winnipeg Route 20 (locally called Lagimodière Boulevard), which bifurcates the riding.

Election results

References

Manitoba provincial electoral districts
Politics of Winnipeg